John Fine (August 26, 1794 – January 4, 1867) was an American lawyer and politician who served one term as a U.S. Representative from New York from 1839 to 1841.

Biography 
Born in New York City, Fine received private instruction.
He was graduated from Columbia College at New York City in 1809.
He studied law in the Litchfield (Connecticut) Law School.
He was admitted to the bar in 1815 and commenced practice in Ogdensburg, St. Lawrence County, New York.
Treasurer of St. Lawrence County 1821–1833.

He served as judge of the court of common pleas for St. Lawrence County from 1824 until his resignation in March 1839.

Congress 
Fine was elected as a Democrat to the Twenty-sixth Congress (March 4, 1839 – March 3, 1841).
He served as again judge of the court of common pleas from February 16, 1843, until the court was abolished in 1847.
He was an unsuccessful candidate for judge of the State supreme court in 1847 and again in 1849.

Later career and death 
He was a member of the New York State Senate (15th D.) in 1848 and 1849.
He resumed the practice of law.
He died in Ogdensburg, New York, January 4, 1867.
He was interred in Ogdensburg Cemetery.

References

1794 births
1867 deaths
Columbia College (New York) alumni
New York (state) state court judges
People from Ogdensburg, New York
Democratic Party New York (state) state senators
Democratic Party members of the United States House of Representatives from New York (state)
19th-century American politicians
19th-century American judges
Politicians from New York City